Bedford Heights is a city in Cuyahoga County, Ohio, United States. It is a suburb of Cleveland. The population was 11,020 at the 2020 census.

History
Bedford Heights was founded on February 20, 1951. It was originally part of Bedford Township and the City of Bedford, Ohio. Robert E. Willeford and his wife, Georgina Willeford, worked diligently to help form the village of Bedford Heights. Robert E. Willeford went on to become the first mayor of Bedford Heights.

The Kol Israel Foundation Holocaust Memorial at Zion Memorial Park was dedicated on May 28, 1961. The monument was recognized as a US national memorial in 2022.

Geography

Demographics

2010 census
As of the census of 2010, there were 10,751 people, 5,111 households, and 2,844 families living in the city. The racial makeup of the city was 18.7% White, 76.9% African American, 0.1% Native American, 1.2% Asian, 1.1% from other races, and 2.1% from two or more races. Hispanic or Latino of any race were 2.6% of the population.

There were 5,111 households, of which 25.9% had children under the age of 18 living with them, 28.9% were married couples living together, 21.8% had a female householder with no husband present, 4.9% had a male householder with no wife present, and 44.4% were non-families. 39.4% of all households were made up of individuals, and 12% had someone living alone who was 65 years of age or older. The average household size was 2.09 and the average family size was 2.78.

The median age in the city was 43.3 years. 19.9% of residents were under the age of 18; 8.8% were between the ages of 18 and 24; 23.3% were from 25 to 44; 31.2% were from 45 to 64; and 16.8% were 65 years of age or older. The gender makeup of the city was 45.9% male and 54.1% female.

2000 census
As of the census of 2000, there were 11,375 people, 5,119 households, and 3,004 families living in the city. The population density was 2,507.4 people per square mile (967.4/km2). There were 5,577 housing units at an average density of 1,229.4 per square mile (474.3/km2). The racial makeup of the city was 27.89% White, 67.42% African American, 0.20% Native American, 1.90% Asian, 0.01% Pacific Islander, 0.54% from other races, and 2.04% from two or more races. Hispanic or Latino of any race were 1.60% of the population.  The second largest ancestry reported by residents of Bedford Heights, after African-American, is Italian.

There were 5,119 households, out of which 24.8% had children under the age of 18 living with them, 36.5% were married couples living together, 18.3% had a female householder with no husband present, and 41.3% were non-families. 36.0% of all households were made up of individuals, and 9.8% had someone living alone who was 65 years of age or older. The average household size was 2.21 and the average family size was 2.87.

In the city the population was spread out, with 21.9% under the age of 18, 8.6% from 18 to 24, 29.8% from 25 to 44, 26.5% from 45 to 64, and 13.2% who were 65 years of age or older. The median age was 39 years. For every 100 females, there were 86.9 males. For every 100 females age 18 and over, there were 83.7 males.

The median income for a household in the city was $37,861, and the median income for a family was $47,328. Males had a median income of $33,599 versus $29,167 for females. The per capita income for the city was $21,791. About 6.8% of families and 7.6% of the population were below the poverty line, including 13.2% of those under age 18 and 4.6% of those age 65 or over.

Bedford Hights has a prominent jewish community and a 1961 erected Kol Israel Holocaust Memorial at the Zion Memorial Park Cemetery.

Surrounding communities

References

External links

 City website

Cities in Ohio
Cities in Cuyahoga County, Ohio
Cleveland metropolitan area